WIEL (1400 AM) is a radio station licensed to Elizabethtown, Kentucky, United States.  The station is owned by Elizabethtown Cbc, Inc. and features programming from ESPN Radio, Motor Racing Network and Westwood One. From the 1960s to the 1980s, the station aired a mix of Adult Contemporary and Top-40 formats.

References

External links

IEL
ESPN Radio stations
Radio stations established in 1974
1974 establishments in Kentucky
Elizabethtown, Kentucky